Klaus-Dieter Buschle (born 30 April 1950) is a German volleyball player. He competed in the men's tournament at the 1972 Summer Olympics.

References

External links
 

1950 births
Living people
German men's volleyball players
Olympic volleyball players of West Germany
Volleyball players at the 1972 Summer Olympics
People from Schwäbisch Gmünd
Sportspeople from Stuttgart (region)
20th-century German people